Disdain is a feeling of contempt or scorn.

Disdain may also refer to:

 USS Disdain (AM-222)
 HMS Disdain (I05)
 So Disdained 1928 novel by Nevil Shute
 Disdain (EP), an EP by Alien Huang
 "Disdain", a song by Knuckle Puck from their 2015 album Copacetic
 "Disdain", by Unsane from Visqueen, 2007